Kunovice is a municipality and village in Vsetín District in the Zlín Region of the Czech Republic. It has about 600 inhabitants.

References

Villages in Vsetín District
Moravian Wallachia